The now defunct North Saskatchewan Junior B Hockey League (NSJHL) was an independent, successful Junior "B" ice hockey league in Saskatchewan, Canada, sanctioned by Hockey Canada.  The league comprised teams from cities and towns such as Saskatoon and Melfort, situated in the northern part of the province of Saskatchewan. 
Conversely, a second  Junior "B" league, the South Saskatchewan (SSJHL)  included teams which were located in towns primarily in the southern part of Saskatchewan, such as Regina, Weyburn and Melville. 
Players who played at the Junior "B" level were approximately 14-20 years old, and Junior "B" was considered the entry level and a "feeder league" into Junior Hockey in Canada (except where Junior "C" or "D" teams existed). Many players who exhibited a high degree of skill eventually graduated to Junior "A", Collegiate, or Major Junior such as the Western Hockey League teams such as the local Saskatoon Blades or teams located in other western provinces such as the New Westminster Bruins in British Columbia, for example. 

Teams from the Saskatchewan Junior "B" leagues had some loose, but informal affiliations with Junior "A" or Major Junior teams, however there was no development system in Junior "B", such as the Bantam Draft for Major Junior Hockey in Canada, in which Major Junior teams for example, could formalize specific access to players, through a draft system. Junior "B" players at the time could try out for any other teams which expressed interest, whether it be in Saskatchewan or elsewhere. No NSJHL team provided other teams a development platform for players where they could be "cherry picked" by Major Junior, Junior "A" or Collegiate teams.
Additionally, Junior "B" players over the age of 17 were eligible for the NHL Amateur Draft. Several outstanding NHLers have played Junior B level hockey, these include San Jose Sharks players Logan Couture and Joe Thornton.
Teams from the NSJHL or the SSJHL did not play each other during the regular season, however, the champion of each league at the end of the season played for the overall Saskatchewan Junior "B" championship. The overall provincial winner then had the opportunity to play in the Canadian Junior B championships for the Keystone Cup. 
In 2007, the North Saskatchewan Junior Hockey League joined the Prairie Junior Hockey League with the intention of creating one league.

History
The NSJHL was originally formed in 1966.  The first season the league included a team from Saskatoon, the Saskatoon Macs, the Shellbrook Knights, the Melfort TM's, and teams from Prince Albert, Humboldt and Outlook.  These six teams participated in the league from 1966 to 1969. In the '69-'70 season, Shellbrook and Melfort both left the league to join other leagues, which provided the opportunity for four new teams to join and represent the cities and towns of North Battleford /St. Thomas, Milden, Unity (Canucks), and another mainstay in the league for years to come, the Saskatoon Wesleys. In 1973 for example, the league consisted of 9 teams including Saskatoon Wesleys, The Saskatoon Quakers, Delisle Bruins, Colonsay Clippers, Battleford Barons, St. Thomas Imperials (1973 League Champs) Kinistino Tiger-Bruins, (Kinistino Tigers) Melfort TMs, and the Nipawan Hawks. Over the years, teams have come and gone, names have changed, however, specific cities have always had teams in the NSJHL, such as Saskatoon and North Battleford. The Saskatoon Wesleys and the Battlefords teams being two of the longstanding franchises to survive and ice a team year over year, until the dissolution of the league in 2007. In some cities for example, Junior B hockey was extremely popular drawing large fan bases, so some of these franchises on the heels of their success moved into bigger, more exciting leagues. An example being the city of Prince Albert, which stepped away from Junior B eventually joining the CHL Western Hockey League as the Prince Albert Raiders to become one of the most prominent Major Junior hockey franchises in Canada with a significant fan base, and many players going to major careers at the professional level. The team in the city of Humboldt, eventually left the NSJHL, and became the Humboldt Broncos, a very highly regarded franchise in the Junior "A" level Saskatchewan Junior Hockey League since 1970. This team has produced many Major Junior and Collegiate level players, as well as many former and current NHL players.

Teams

Former teams

Shellbrook Knights - Shellbrook Saskatchewan
Melfort TM's - Melfort Saskatchewan
Meadow Lake Stampeders - Meadow Lake, Saskatchewan
Prince Albert North Stars - Prince Albert, Saskatchewan
Battleford Breakers - Battleford, Saskatchewan
Battleford Barons- Battleford, Saskatchewan

Season Information
1991-92 NSJHL Season

Champions
2007   Saskatoon Royals
2006   Saskatoon Royals
2005  	Saskatoon Royals
2004 	Tri-Town Thunder
2003 	Warman Valley Crusaders
2002  	Saskatoon Chiefs
2001 	Saskatoon Royals
2000 	Saskatoon Royals
1999 	Saskatoon Royals
1998 	Saskatoon Royals
1997 	Saskatoon Royals
1996 	Saskatoon Royals
1995 	Saskatoon Royals
1994 	Kinistino Tigers
1993 	Kinistino Tigers
1992 	Kinistino Tigers
1991 	Kinistino Tigers
1990 	Kinistino Tigers
1989 	Kinistino Tigers
1988 	Warman Valley Crusaders
1987 	Hudson Bay Saints
1986 	Prince Albert North Stars
1985 	Prince Albert North Stars
1984 	Saskatoon Westleys
1983 	Saskatoon Westleys
1982 	Saskatoon Quakers
1981 	Hudson Bay Saints
1980 	Melfort TM's
1979 	Melfort TM's
1978 	Saskatoon Quakers
1977 	Team Melfort
1976 	Team Melfort
1975 	Saskatoon Quakers
1974 	Saskatoon Quakers
1973 	St Thomas Imperials North Battleford
1972 	St Thomas Imperials North Battleford
1971 	Saskatoon Macs
1970 	St Peters College
1969 	Prince Albert Knights

See also
 List of ice hockey teams in Saskatchewan

External links
 Prairie Junior Hockey League

Defunct ice hockey leagues in Saskatchewan
Defunct junior ice hockey leagues in Canada